A panegyris  ( "gathering"), is an Ancient Greek general, national or religious assembly. Each was dedicated to the worship of a particular god. It is also associated with saint days and holy festivals. Panegryis is used three ways: A meeting of the inhabitants from one town and its vicinity, a meeting of inhabitants of an entire province, district, or of people belonging to a particular tribe, and for national meetings. The panegyreis were festivals in which prayers were made, sacrifices offered, and also processions.

Relation to panegyry and panegyric
Πανήγυρις is also transliterated as panegyry, and in turn, some sources define panegyry to be a panegyric.
A panegyric is a formal public speech. This could be a separate usage of panegyry, an obsolete usage, or simply an error.

References

 
Greek words and phrases